Stephen Woodworth is an American speculative fiction author, and a native of Fullerton, California.

Publications 
 "Scary Monsters" (novella), in Writers of the Future VIII (August 1992)
 "Relaxation" (short story), in Plot #1 (Winter 1994)
 "a Woman Absent" (short story), in Dead of Night #13 (Summer 1995)
 "Keepers of the Light" (short story), in Keen Science Fiction! #2 (May 1996)
 "Purple Hearts and Other Wounds" (short story), in Fear the Fever: Hot Blood VII (July 1, 1996)
 "Serial Killers" (vignette), in Horrors! 365 Scary Stories: Get Your Daily Dose of Terror (October 1998)
 "Her" (short story), in The Magazine of Fantasy & Science Fiction #570 (Vol. 96, Issue 2; February 1999)
 "Street Runes" (short story), in After Shocks: an Anthology of So-Cal Horror (May 1, 2000)
 "Jack's Hand" (short story), in Aboriginal Science Fiction #63 (Spring 2000)
 "Transubstantiation" (short story), at Strange Horizons (November 27, 2000)
 "Because It is Bitter" (short story), in Tales of the Unanticipated #22 (April 1, 2001)
 "the Little Nightmusic That Could" (short story), in Weird Tales #328 (Summer 2002)
 "Prisoners" (short story), in Gothic.Net: Volume One (July 5, 2004)
 Through Violet Eyes (novel), by Dell Publishing (August 31, 2004)
 With Red Hands (novel), by Dell Publishing (December 28, 2004)
 In Golden Blood (novel), by Dell Publishing (October 25, 2005)
 From Black Rooms (novel), by Bantam Books (October 31, 2006)

Awards 
 Writers of the Future Contest, for "Scary Monsters" (4th quarter, 1992); 1st place

References 
 L. Ron Hubbard Writers of the Future Contest

External links
 Stephen Woodworth's MySpace Page
 Entry at Fantasticfiction
 

20th-century American novelists
21st-century American novelists
American science fiction writers
American horror novelists
American male novelists
Writers from California
Living people
American male short story writers
20th-century American short story writers
21st-century American short story writers
20th-century American male writers
21st-century American male writers
Year of birth missing (living people)